The 2018 season is Hougang United's 21st consecutive season in the top flight of Singapore football and in the S.League. Along with the S.League, the club will also compete in the Singapore Cup.

Squad

S.League Squad

U19 Team

Coaching staff 
2018

Transfers

Pre-season transfers

ln

Out

Extension

Promoted

Trial

Mid-season transfers

In

Out

Trial

Friendlies

Pre-Season Friendly

Surabaya Pre-Season Training

Malaysia Pre-season tour

Team statistics

Appearances and goals

Competitions

Overview

Singapore Premier League

Singapore Cup

Hougang United lost 3-0 on aggregate.

References 

Hougang United FC
Hougang United FC seasons